Laurel Cronin (October 10, 1939 – October 26, 1992) was an American actress, singer and dancer.

Biography
Cronin was born on October 10, 1939, to Frank and Elizabeth Lewis.  She had a son, Christopher, and a daughter, Jennifer.  She maintained a residence in Oak Park, Illinois, for twenty years.

Prior to her move to Los Angeles in 1990, Cronin worked thirty-five years of her career in theatre based in Chicago.  In 1987, she won the Joseph Jefferson Award for Best Actress for her performance as Mrs. Hardcastle in She Stoops to Conquer at the Court Theatre. In 1980, she also appeared on Broadway in Passione.

On October 26, 1992, Cronin died of cancer at the age of 53 at Northwestern Memorial Hospital.

Filmography

References

External links
 
 
 

1939 births
1992 deaths
American film actresses
American television actresses
American stage actresses
Actresses from Chicago
Actors from Oak Park, Illinois
Actresses from Los Angeles
Deaths from cancer in Illinois
People from Forest Park, Illinois
20th-century American actresses